This is a list of the Croatia national under-21 football team results from 1992 to 1999.

The first match played by Croatia was against Hungary in 1992 in Zagreb, Croatia.

Croatia's first-ever competitive matches were in the 1996 UEFA European Under-21 Championship qualification. The team failed to qualify for the final tournament. After a successful run at the 2000 UEFA European Under-21 Championship qualification, Croatia entered the 2000 UEFA European Under-21 Championship after beating Portugal through play-offs in 1999.

Croatia also participated in the 1997 Toulon Tournament in France, dropping out in a group stage.

Key 

Match outcomes

As per statistical convention in football, matches decided in extra time are counted as wins and losses, while matches decided by penalty shoot-outs are counted as draws.

By year

1992

1993

1994

1995

1996

1997

1998

1999

Record per opponent 

1990s in Croatia
Croatia national under-21 football team